Andrianopoulos is a Greek surname. It may refer to:

Alex Andrianopoulos (born 1955), Australian politician
Leonidas Andrianopoulos (1911-2011), Greek footballer, brother of Vassilis and Yiannis
Vassilis Andrianopoulos (1908-1989), Greek footballer, brother of Leonidas and Yiannis
Yiannis Andrianopoulos (1900-1952), Greek footballer, brother of Leonidas and Vassilis

Greek-language surnames
Surnames